Brynseng is a rapid transit station on the Oslo Metro system located in the Helsfyr borough. The station is shared by three lines, the Østensjø Line (Line 3), the Furuset Line (Line 2) and the Lambertseter Line (Line  1 and 4). The station has four platforms. The two northernmost platforms are for trains on the Østensjø- and Furuset Line. The Lambertseter Line uses the two other platforms before turning south and leaving the other two lines. At Brynseng Station is one of the train yards for the metro operator Oslo T-banedrift.

References

External links

Oslo Metro stations in Oslo
Railway stations opened in 1966
1966 establishments in Norway